Frantzety Herard (born 10 March 2002) is a Haitian professional footballer who plays as a forward for Cibao.

Club career
Herard was born in Mirebalais, Haiti, but moved to the Dominican Republic as a child. He started playing football at his school, the Instituto Iberia. He played for Cibao before moving to Japan to train with Vissel Kobe in 2019.

On his return to the Dominican Republic, Herard rejoined Cibao, where he played mostly for the club's reserve team in the Dominican second division. After two years with Cibao, he moved to San Cristóbal in March 2022. He scored his first goal for his new club on 23 April 2022, in a 2–2 draw with Moca.

Career statistics

Club

Notes

References

2002 births
Living people
Haitian footballers
Haiti youth international footballers
Haitian expatriate footballers
Association football forwards
Liga Dominicana de Fútbol players
Vissel Kobe players
Cibao FC players
CA San Cristóbal players
Haitian expatriate sportspeople in Japan
Expatriate footballers in Japan
Haitian expatriate sportspeople in the Dominican Republic
Expatriate footballers in the Dominican Republic